is a Japanese football player. He plays for Iwaki FC, on loan from Tokyo Verdy.

Club career
On 17 December 2021, Takagiwa officially signed to J2 club, Tokyo Verdy.

On 25 December 2022, Takagiwa was loaned out to J2 promotion club, Iwaki FC from 2023 season.

Career statistics

Club 
Updated to the start from 2023 season.

References

External links
Profile at JEF United Chiba
Profile at Shimizu S-Pulse

1995 births
Living people
Association football people from Tochigi Prefecture
Japanese footballers
Japan youth international footballers
J1 League players
J2 League players
J3 League players
Shimizu S-Pulse players
J.League U-22 Selection players
JEF United Chiba players
V-Varen Nagasaki players
Tokyo Verdy players
Iwaki FC players
Association football goalkeepers